Euseius alatus is a species of mite in the family Phytoseiidae.

References

alatus
Articles created by Qbugbot
Animals described in 1966